Anoplonida patae is a species of squat lobster in the family Munididae. The species name is dedicated to Patsy A. McLaughlin, a crustacean systematist.

References

Squat lobsters
Crustaceans described in 2006